Mateo Alejandro Émile Zambrano Bailón (born 2 April 1998) is a footballer who plays as a striker for El Nacional. Born in France, he was a youth international for Ecuador.

Career

Club career

Before the 2016 season, Zambrano signed for Ecuadorian side El Nacional, where he suffered relegation to the Ecuadorian second division. On 3 November 2019, he debuted for El Nacional during a 1-0 win over Macará. On 19 March 2021, Zambrano scored his first goal for El Nacional during a 1-1 draw with América de Quito.

International career

Zambrano is eligible to represent France internationally through his mother and having been born in Paris. He is the son of Ecuadorian politician .

References

External links
 

Living people
Ecuadorian people of French descent
Footballers from Paris
Ecuadorian footballers
Association football forwards
1998 births
Ecuadorian Serie A players
Ecuadorian Serie B players
S.D. Quito footballers
C.D. El Nacional footballers
French people of Ecuadorian descent